Portchester is a village the Borough of Fareham in Hampshire, England. Its population according to the 2011 United Kingdom census was 17,789.

Name
Portchester is derived from its former Latin name Portus Adurni and the Old English suffix ceaster ("fort; fortified town"), itself derived from the Latin word “castrum.”

History

The fort of Portus Adurni is considered the best-preserved Roman fort north of the Alps. It is sometimes identified as the Caer Peris listed by the 9th-century History of the Britons as among the 28 cities of Britain. The medieval Portchester Castle was built within the Roman fort.

Amenities
As well as the castle, its parish church  is listed as a Grade I protected building. There are also many historic houses in Castle Street. This suburb is well placed for waterfront leisure activities, only a short distance from the UK's 3rd-largest marina at Port Solent, from the historic city of Portsmouth, and from the market town of Fareham.

Public open spaces
 Portchester Castle
 Portsdown Hill - Including Portchester Common a Site of Special Scientific Interest (SSSI)
 Wicor Recreation Ground - Home to A.F.C. Portchester and Wicor Skate Park.

Schools
 Portchester Community School, a mixed comprehensive community school for 11- to 16-year-olds.
 Wicor Primary School
 Northern Infant School
 Northern Junior School
 Red Barn Primary School
 Castle Primary School

Crematorium
Opened in 1958, it is on the lower slopes of Portsdown Hill. It is owned by a Joint Committee representing the City of Portsmouth and the Boroughs of Fareham, Havant and Gosport. It has two chapels, the North (added 1969) and South (original).  Those cremated there include two World War I Victoria Cross recipients, Norman Augustus Finch and James Ockendon who both died in 1966.

Sport and leisure

Portchester has a Non-League football club A.F.C. Portchester, which plays at Wicor Recreation Ground.

Notable residents
Neil Astley, publisher and founding editor of Bloodaxe Books, born in Portchester
Emily Farmer, watercolour painter
Neil Gaiman, author, born in Portchester
Steve Ridgway, Chief Executive, Virgin Atlantic Airways
Mike Hancock, former MP for Portsmouth South and former Councilor for Fratton ward, has lived here for over 30 years

Transport

Rail

Portchester railway station is managed and operated by South Western Railway with frequent Southern Railway services. Services run along the coast to Southampton, Fareham, Portsmouth, Havant, Chichester and Brighton. London services to London Waterloo (via Fareham) and London Victoria (via Barnham) also stop at the station.

Bus services

First Hampshire & Dorset services to Portsmouth, Havant, Fareham, Titchfield, Locks Heath and Warsash.

Road

The A27 road cuts through the centre of Portchester running east/west between Fareham and Cosham on the northern outskirts of Portsmouth. Access to the M27 motorway is via Junction 11 at Fareham or Junction 12 at Port Solent.

See also
A.F.C. Portchester
List of places of worship in the Borough of Fareham
Portchester Community School

References

External links
 St Mary's
 Portchester Castle Information

Borough of Fareham
Villages in Hampshire